The 1970 Monaco Grand Prix was a Formula One motor race held at the Circuit de Monaco on 10 May 1970. It was race 3 of 13 in both the 1970 World Championship of Drivers and the 1970 International Cup for Formula One Manufacturers. Jochen Rindt scored the last victory for the famous Lotus 49.

This was Bruce McLaren's final Formula One race - as he was killed 5 days before the next race at Belgium - and Ronnie Peterson's first.

Report
There were no significant changes in the drivers' lineup for Monaco, and the only new driver was Ronnie Peterson, entering in a non-works March. The Lotus team decided to bring the old 49C chassis instead of the new 72, despite testing the new car in a non-championship race at Silverstone a couple of weeks earlier. In qualifying March swept the front row, with Jackie Stewart on pole (for the Tyrrell team) and Chris Amon alongside him. Third was Denny Hulme's McLaren, and fourth the Brabham of Jack Brabham; behind them was the Ferrari of Jacky Ickx. The first Lotus driver was Jochen Rindt, qualifying in eighth place.

Despite heavy rain during the practice laps, the drivers raced in clear conditions and on a dry track. Stewart led the field with Amon, Brabham, Ickx and Jean-Pierre Beltoise behind him; Hulme got a poor start and was way down the order after the first corner. On the second lap, Beltoise passed Ickx, who retired on lap 12 with a driveshaft failure. On lap 22 Beltoise, now in fourth, retired with transmission problems; on the same lap Brabham passed Amon to take second place. Stewart remained the race leader until his car began misfiring on lap 27. After a long pit stop, Stewart returned to the race only to eventually retire. This left Brabham in the lead, with Amon, Hulme and Rindt following. The engine failed on Jackie Oliver's BRM, who retired due to quickly falling oil pressure. At around the same time, Hulme developed problems with the gearing of his McLaren and so dropped back behind Rindt and Henri Pescarolo.

On lap 62 Amon's suspension failed; he was forced to retire, leaving Rindt in second place nine seconds behind Brabham. Rindt increased his pace, able to close the gap to Brabham. On the final corner of the last lap, however, Brabham defended the inside line to prevent Rindt from passing. There was less traction on the dusty surface off the racing line, and Brabham locked the wheels under braking and the car skidded across the track towards the barriers.  Rindt passed behind him and won the race.  Brabham quickly reversed and finished the race in second position. Third was Pescarolo in a Matra, while the remaining points positions were rounded out by Hulme, Graham Hill (who worked his way up from the last spot on the grid) and Pedro Rodríguez.

Qualifying

Qualifying classification

Race

Classification

Championship standings after the race

Drivers' Championship standings

Constructors' Championship standings

References

Further reading

Monaco Grand Prix
Monaco Grand Prix
Grand Prix
May 1970 sports events in Europe